Lake Greenwood State Park is a state park located near the town of Ninety Six in Greenwood County, South Carolina. The  park partially occupies a series of peninsulas bordering  Lake Greenwood.

The state park consists of land donated in 1938, during the Great Depression, by Greenwood County. It was one of 16 state parks developed by the Civilian Conservation Corps in South Carolina, a program established by President Franklin D. Roosevelt to create employment while investing in construction of infrastructure. Many of the structures built by the corps are still prominent features and amenities, including picnic shelters, a water fountain, a lakeside terrace, and a boathouse.

Activities available at the park include picnicking, fishing, boating, hiking and camping.

The John Drummond and Holly Self Drummond Environmental Education Conference Center includes the Civilian Conservation Corps Museum. It features interactive exhibits detailing the history and projects of the Civilian Conservation Corps in South Carolina parks. The Conference Center is used for meetings and events.

An annual half distance Ironman competition is hosted by the park each September.

External links 
 
 Greenwood Lake Nature - trail
 List of CCC activities in South Carolina parks

State parks of South Carolina
Protected areas of Greenwood County, South Carolina
Museums in Greenwood County, South Carolina
Civilian Conservation Corps museums
History museums in South Carolina
Civilian Conservation Corps in South Carolina
1938 establishments in South Carolina
Protected areas established in 1938